The 2nd Bodil Awards ceremony was held on 29 April 1949 at Palace Hotel's night club Ambassadeur in Copenhagen, Denmark, honouring the best national and foreign films of 1938. Ib Schønberg acted as host and  Lily Broberg, Poul Reichhardt and Grethe Thordahl performed at the event which was attended by 300 guests.

Bodil Ipsen's and Lau Lauritzen, Jr.'s The Viking Watch of the Danish Seaman won the award for Best Danish  Film and Johannes Meyer won the award for Best Supporting Actor for his role in it. Mogens Wieth won the award for Best Leading Actor for his role in Kampen mod uretten. Karin Nellemose won the award for Best Leading Actress for her perfor role in the same film and the award for Best Supporting Actress for Mens porten var lukket.

Winners

See also 
 Robert Awards

References

External links 
 Official website

Bodil Awards ceremonies
1948 film awards
1949 in Denmark
1940s in Copenhagen
April 1949 events in Europe